The Kingdom of Serbia was occupied by Austria-Hungary and the Kingdom of Bulgaria on 1 January 1916. The Army Staff sent Chetnik veteran Kosta Pećanac into the Toplica District to organize a guerrilla uprising. Several Chetnik (guerrilla) detachments were established throughout the occupied territory.

Background
In October 1915, Kingdom of Serbia, which had throughout fall 1914 managed to withstand and repel three Austro-Hungarian invasions, found itself under attack again. This time it was a joint Austro-Hungarian, German, and Bulgarian invasion from two directions that included Austro-Hungarian Third Army, German Eleventh Army, and Bulgarian First and Second armies. Outnumbered and outmatched, the Serbian Army was defeated by December 1915. However, rather than surrendering and capitulating, the Serbian military and political leaders decided on a long and arduous army retreat south towards Albania in hopes of reaching the Adriatic coast for evacuation and regrouping. As a result, the invading Central Powers forces occupied the entire territory of the Kingdom of Serbia. In the immediate division of spoils, the Kingdom of Bulgaria got the area of Pomoravlje, which had been a target of Bulgarian nationalism.

Detachments
Toplica-South Morava (Central) Detachment, commanded by Kosta Pećanac
Jablanica Detachment, commanded by Milinko Vlahović, then Dimitrije Begović
Tulare battalion, commanded by Milan Đurović
Second Jablanica battalion, commanded by Ivan Plavšić
Retkocer battalion, 
Gajtan Detachment
Medveđa Detachment
Ibar-Kopaonik Detachment, commanded by Kosta Vojinović
Pirot Detachment, commanded by Jovan Radović
Krajina Detachment

Toplica insurrection

In September 1916, the Serbian high command sent Kosta Pećanac into the Toplica District to organize a guerrilla uprising. There, Pećanac contacted several groups and joined forces with local leader Kosta Vojinović and they both established headquarters on Mount Kopaonik. In January–February 1917 the Bulgarians began conscripting local Serbs for military service and a rumor was spread that the Allies had reached Skopje, so the Serbs should rise in revolt. The decision for this rebellion was taken and on February 21, near the Toplica river the rebellion broke out. The leaders gathered several hundreds of rebels who conquered Prokuplje and Kuršumlija. Pećanac also attempted to join the Albanians, but without success. On March 12, the Bulgarian counter-attack started under the command of Alexander Protogerov involving IMRO forces led by Tane Nikolov. Bulgarian and Austro-Hungarian authorities worked together. In the battles, one of the leaders of the IMRO Todor Aleksandrov, serving as an officer in the Bulgarian army, commanded the most violent actions committed by the paramilitary. After several days of fighting, the Bulgarians entered Prokuplje on March 14 and Austro-Hungarians Kuršumlija. As of March 25, the order there was fully restored. In the battles, several thousand people were killed, including civilians. In April 1917, Pećanac and his guerrillas attacked a railway station. On May 15, Pećanac entered the old Bulgarian border and invaded Bosilegrad, which was burned. Then his band withdrew to Kosovo, controlled at the time by the Austro-Hungarians. The Allies opened a new front at Salonika in June but the Serbian Army was unable to break through the Bulgarian lines. After reemerging again for a short time, in September–October 1917 Pećanac again disappeared. In October 1917 the Austro-Hungarian command created entirely Albanian paramilitary detachments to capture the rest of the Serbian rebels into the mountains and in December 1917, Vojnović was killed.

See also
Serbian Campaign of World War I
Serbian Chetnik Organization

References

Sources

Military units and formations of Serbia in World War I
Chetniks
Serbian rebels
1916 establishments in Serbia
1916 in Serbia
1917 in Serbia
1918 in Serbia